Bolboceratinae is a subfamily of earth-boring scarab beetles in the family Geotrupidae. There are about 8 genera and at least 40 described species in Bolboceratinae.

Catalogue of Life and GBIF now consider Bolboceratinae to be a family, Bolboceratidae, rather than a subfamily. ITIS currently treats Bolboceratinae as a subfamily of Geotrupidae.

Genera
These eight genera belong to the subfamily Bolboceratinae:
 Bolbelasmus Boucomont, 1911
 Bolbocerastes Cartwright, 1953
 Bolbocerosoma Schaeffer, 1906
 Bolborhombus Cartwright, 1953
 Bradycinetulus Cockerell, 1906
 Eucanthus Westwood, 1848
 Neoathyreus Howden and Martínez, 1963
 Odonteus Samouelle, 1819

References

Further reading

External links

 

Geotrupidae
Articles created by Qbugbot